Crimean campaign can refer to:

The Russian Crimean campaigns of 1687 and 1689 
The main campaign of the Crimean War, 1853-1855 
The German Crimean Campaign, 1941-1942
The Soviet Crimean Offensive, 1944

See also
Crimean War (disambiguation)